Paul Crowley (born December 26, 1955) is a Canadian former professional ice hockey winger who played in the World Hockey Association (WHA).

Career 
Drafted in the tenth round of the 1975 NHL Amateur Draft by the Toronto Maple Leafs, Crowley was also selected by the Houston Aeros in the fifth round of the 1975 WHA Amateur Draft. He played in four games for the Toronto Toros during the 1975–76 WHA season. He spent his final seven professional seasons playing for four teams in the American Hockey League (AHL).

Career statistics

References

External links

1955 births
Living people
Binghamton Dusters players
Binghamton Whalers players
Buffalo Norsemen players
Canadian ice hockey right wingers
Charlotte Checkers (SHL) players
Hershey Bears players
Houston Aeros draft picks
Ice hockey people from Montreal
Mohawk Valley Comets (NAHL) players
Rochester Americans players
Sudbury Wolves players
Toronto Maple Leafs draft picks
Toronto Toros players